The American Society of Criminology (ASC) is an international organization based on the campus of Ohio State University whose members focus on the study of crime and delinquency. It aims to grow and disseminate scholarly research, with members working in many disciplines and on different levels in the fields of criminal justice and criminology.  The Society and its members also seek to strengthen the role of research in the formulation of public policy. To further these goals, the Society holds an annual meeting that attracts some 4,000+ attendees from roughly 40 countries.

History
Perhaps as early as 1932, former Berkeley, California police officer and then San Jose State College Professor William A. Wiltberger began to bring together a group of individuals on a sporadic basis to informally discuss contemporary law enforcement issues. It appears that the bulk of those involved in these discussions had either taken classes from August Vollmer at the University of California, Berkeley and/or had been police officers in the Berkeley Police Department when Vollmer served there as Chief. 

The group called themselves the "V- men", recognizing Vollmer as their intellectual leader. 
It remains unclear, however, as to what direct role Vollmer may have had with respect to these early discussion groups.
In 1939, Professor Wiltberger formally organized the discussion group as the National Association of College Police School Administrators with himself as the President and his former student, Willard E. Schmidt, as Vice President and Secretary. 

In late December 1941, anticipating his eminent departure into the military subsequent to the raid on Pearl Harbor, Wiltberger looked for someone else to take charge. August Vollmer agreed to step in. On December 30, 1941, August invited seven men to
his home in Berkeley. William Wiltberger and Willard Schmidt were both present. The
meeting began at 10:15 am, and did not conclude until after midnight. At this meeting, Wiltberger's organization was re-named the National Association of College Police
Training Officials. August Vollmer (then 65 years old) was named President-Emeritus, and Orlando W. Wilson (one of Vollmer's former students) was named President.

The organization was renamed the Society for the Advancement of Criminology in 1946, and renamed the American Society of Criminology after a meeting held in March 1957 at the University of Southern California.

Divisions
The Society has a number of divisions.  They have been stablished at different times over its history, from the Division of International Criminology established in 1981 to the Division of Public Opinion and Policy established in 2021.

Publications
The Society publishes a newsletter, The Criminologist, and two journals.  The journal Criminology has been published since 1963. It is generally regarded as the leading journal in the field, and is distributed worldwide. The journal Criminology & Public Policy has been published since 2001.

Many of the Society divisions also publish journals and newsletters.

See also 
 Crime in the United States
 Public criminology

References

External links

Criminology organizations
Organizations established in 1941
Crime in the San Francisco Bay Area
Organizations based in Berkeley, California